Bahget Iskander (born 8 May 1943) is a Syrian-born Hungarian cinematographer.

Life 

He was born on 14 August 1943 in El-Barazin, Syria. He has been living in Hungary since 1967, and has been a Hungarian citizen also since 1979. His wife Sarolta Bodor is an insurance specialist at Alianz Hungary. He has two children, Leila is an economist and Zsolt is a lawyer, he also has two grandsons and a granddaughter. He graduated from the Technical College of Kecskemét as an engineer and then in 1976 he became a teacher-engineer. After finishing his studies he had several workplaces, among them he worked for SZIM in Kecskemét, for Agrikon as a qualified engineer and later on he represented his Hungarian firm in Algeria and Morocco. Except the jobs abroad he lives in Kecskemét-Hetényegyháza.

He has been working as a photographer since 1968; he usually exhibits at collective and individual exhibitions.

He has exhibited his photos for more than 250 times at individual exhibitions. Among others he organized an exhibition for the benefit of refugees from Transylvania in 1989 and for the autistic children in 1999, and he nobly offered his works for the restoration works of the Hungarian Photographers' House in 2002. In addition to this he is the member of the Town-Planning Association in Hetényegyháza. Since 1990 he has been taking advertisement and fashion photos in his own studio and he has been designing leaflets, prospectuses and catalogues.

Several reviews and the media have been dealing with him both in Hungary and abroad. Mainly his black and white social photos, portraits, landscapes of the desert, and photos of outstanding Hungarian literary men are well known (for instance: Gyula Illyés, György Faludy, Ferenc Buda, Sándor Kányádi, András Sütő, Nándor Gion, Péter Esterházy, Balázs Diószegi, Menyhért Tóth). He is closely connected to FORRÁS, a magazine on literature, sociography and art in Kecskemét. He was participant and exhibitor of the creative community centre in Nagybaracska from its foundation till its cessation. At the end of the year 2006 he made a unique attempt, namely he made the private portfolio for twelve sportsmen chosen from the talented youths of Kecskemét. He prepared an excellent artistic calendar from these portfolios and a series of exhibition started. He regularly participates at the Pens' Camp in Veránka. He introduces and presents the illustrious and outstanding Hungarian cultural and historical events and figures with his writings and photos in the monthly magazine Blue Danube, an Arabian language magazine published in almost twenty countries of the world. Furthermore, he is a collaborator at the Kecskemét Magazine as well as at the Kecskemet Information website

His photos are usually displayed in the weekly magazine titled Kecskeméti Lapok.

He is a founding member and a fellow-worker of the Hetényi Köztér (Plaza of Hetény) newspaper.

A portrait movie of Iskander edited by Zsuzsanna Sári was presented on the 39th Hungarian Film Festival.

Membership 
1968 Rosti Pál Photo Club
1972 Photo Club, Kecskemét, Hungary
1980 The Association of the Hungarian

Photographers 
1987 Art Foundation (today: Association of the Hungarian Artists)
1990 The Association of the Hungarian

Journalists 
He has also been a member of the Workshop Artistic Association. The number of his awards, prizes is over one hundred, among others:
 1968 National University and College Photo Competition Award
1977 Nivo Award of Association of Hungarian Photoartists
1978 1st place at the 13th Gyula Kulich Premfoto

Exhibition in Békéscsaba 
 1979 Nivo Award of Association of Hungarian Photoartists
 1979 Art Award of Bács-Kiskun County
 1986 SZMT-prize
 1987 Award by the Ministry of Culture
 2004 Award for the Public Education of Kecskemét
 2005 Art Award of Bács-Kiskun County
 2007 Candidate representing Bács-Kiskun County for Prima Primissima Award and reaching the final
 2008 The order of merit of the Hungarian Republic - Knight Cross
 2010 Regional Prima Award/Hungarian fine art category
 2010 Award of the Ministry of Culture of Egypt
 2011 Award of Ministry of Arts, Culture and heritage of Qatar
 2011 Pilinszky Award
 2012 "Pro urbe" Award, City of Kecskemet
 2012 Order of Merit of the Hungarian Republic, Officer's Cross
 2012 Pro Urbe Prize, Kecskemét
 2012 Order of Merit of the Hungarian Republic, Officer's Cross

Main collective and one-man shows and exhibitions 

1975 Calgary, Canada; Alabama, USA
1976 Calgary, Canada; New-Zealand, Dunaújváros, Hungary
1977 Hong Kong, Nagykanizsa, Mosonmagyaróvár, Szolnok, Gyula, Hungary
1978 Kecskemét, Kalocsa, Hetényegyháza, Lajosmizse, Hungary
1979 Dávod, Kecskemét, Pécs, Kaposvár, Marcalli, Izsák, Lakitelek, Kazincbarcika, Salgótarján, Makó, Kiskunmajsa, Balástya, Kiskunfélegyháza, Hungary, Yugoslavia
1981 Blida, Algeria
1983 Budapest, Hungary
1984 Kecskemét, Nyíregyháza, Hungary
1987 Budapest, Hungary
1996 Denmark; Targu Mures, Romania
2000 Szeged, Hungary
2001 France
2002 Kecskemét, Dunaújváros, Hungary
2003 Csongrád, Hódmezővásárhely, Hungary; Miercurea Ciuc, Targu Mures, Odorheiu Secuiesc, Romania
2004 Damascus, Jebla, Lattaki, Syria; Kiskunhalas, Kecskemét
2005 Kecskemét, Békéscsaba; Jebla, Syria
2006 Kecskemét, Kecel, Császártöltés; Zombor, Serbia
2007 Kecskemét, Hetényegyháza
2008 Zombor, Serbia; Jabla, Syria; Kecskemét, Nagykőrös, Soltvadkert
2009 Lakitelek, Budapest, Kecel, Hungary
2010 Tiszakécske, Hungary; Damascus, Latakia, Syria; Kairo, Egypt; Tokaj, Budapest, Kecskemét, Hungary /Egyiptom "magyarab" szemmel/
2011 Doha, Qatar
2012 Kiskőrös, Hungary
2013 Budapest, Hungary Museion No.1 Art Gallery
2014 Budapest, Hungary National Dance Theatre
2014 Kecskemét, Hungary "MOTHERHOOD-ANYASÁG"
2014 Sofia, Bulgaria Exhibition and Traveling exhibition
2014 Vienna, Austria Egyptian Cultural Center
2015 Budapest, Hungary Buda Castle- National Széchényi Library
2016 Sophia –NDK Bulgary

His works can be found in many collections, image library, museum, inter alia, Romania, Transylvania, Serbia, Bulgary, the Museum of Photography in Kecskemét, National Museum of Egypt (Ahmad Shawki Museum) and Latakia in Syria Cultural Center, Qatar and Oman, Art Photographers Association.
A number of media appearances, weekly and daily newspapers, radio and television interviews dealt with in his works, both in Hungary and abroad His permanent exhibition can be visited at the
Community Centre of Hetényegyháza

Filmography 
1996 Film Portrait by János Kriskó, Kecskemét TV
2008 Film Portrait by Zsuzsanna Sári shown on 39rd Hungarian Film Festival, Bem Cinema
2012 Interview with photographer Bahget Iskander in Aljazeera
2014 Photo album „A handful of world”, which summarizes my life's work, was published in 2012. The album serves as a basis for dialogue between cultures. In September 2013, the cultural magazine „Forrás” (Source) published a wide interview and appreciation about my art activities. DUNA TV. KULTIKON
2014 MTVA – Kvartett
2015 DUNA TV. KULTIKUN
2016 AL Ghad Al Arabi TV Channel / "Mubdeoon"2016 a film was made with Bahget Iskander to show his workmanship in Arabian language KTV-Politics, public life magazine

References 
https://web.archive.org/web/20190101021714/http://iskander.hu/
http://artportal.hu/lexikon/muveszek/bahget-iskander-3849
http://www.bacstudastar.hu/bahget-iskander
http://www.forrasfolyoirat.hu/0810/banszky.pdf

1943 births
Living people
Hungarian cinematographers
Hungarian people of Syrian descent